Richardson is an unincorporated community located in the town of Clayton, Polk County, Wisconsin, United States.

History
Richardson was originally called Marsh Lake; the present name was given in honor of Eugene Richardson, a pioneer settler. A post office called Marsh Lake was in operation from 1878 until 1879, and a post office called Richardson was in operation from 1881 until 1918.

Notes

Unincorporated communities in Polk County, Wisconsin
Unincorporated communities in Wisconsin